Kentucky Route 538 (KY 538) is a  state highway in Boyd County, Kentucky that runs from U.S. Route 60 and Meade Springer Road west of Rockdale to U.S. Route 23 south of Catlettsburg via Rockdale.

Major intersections

References

0538
Transportation in Boyd County, Kentucky